Jeff Pearlman (born 1972) is an American sports writer. He has written nine books that have appeared on The New York Times Best Seller list: four about football, three on baseball and two about basketball. He was the author of the infamous 1999 John Rocker interview in Sports Illustrated.

Books
Pearlman is the author of The Bad Guys Won, a biography of the 1986 New York Mets subtitled, "A Season of Brawling, Boozing, Bimbo-chasing and Championship Baseball with Straw, Doc, Mookie, Nails, The Kid, and the Rest of the 1986 Mets, the Rowdiest Team Ever to Put on a New York Uniform--and Maybe the Best." In 2004, the book spent eight weeks on The New York Times Best Seller list. 

Pearlman followed that up with his 2006 publication of Love Me, Hate Me, an unauthorized biography of Barry Bonds for which the author said he interviewed 524 subjects. Pearlman said that because Love Me, Hate Me was released three weeks after Game of Shadows, it quickly faded.

His third book, Boys Will Be Boys, on the 1990s Dallas Cowboys dynasty, spent 10 weeks on the New York Times bestseller's list.  

His fourth book, a biography of Roger Clemens titled The Rocket That Fell to Earth, was released by HarperCollins on March 24, 2009. The book is a detailed account of Clemens' life on and off the baseball field. 

Pearlman next wrote Sweetness, a biography of Walter Payton, the late Chicago Bears running back. 

In March 2014, Pearlman released Showtime: Magic, Kareem, Riley, and the Los Angeles Lakers Dynasty of the 1980s, a biography of the 1980s Los Angeles Lakers. It became his fourth New York Times best seller. The book was adapted into the HBO docudrama series Winning Time: The Rise of the Lakers Dynasty, which was released in 2022.

His seventh book, a biography of Brett Favre titled Gunslinger, was released in October 2016 and spent considerable time on the New York Times bestseller's list.  In Gunslinger, Pearlman chronicles Favre's life, from his early years in Kiln, Mississippi and playing quarterback for the high school team coached by his father, through his years at the University of Southern Mississippi and his NFL career with the Atlanta Falcons, Green Bay Packers, New York Jets and Minnesota Vikings.  In addition to reporting on Favre's football career, Pearlman also addresses Favre's life off the field, including his marriage and family life as well as his problems with alcohol and pain medication.  Pearlman did not interview Favre for the book but he did interview some of Favre's family members and many teammates and coaches. 

Pearlman wrote Football for a Buck, released in 2018, about the United States Football League. It spent several months on the New York Times best seller list.

In 2020, Pearlman released Three-Ring Circus: Kobe, Shaq, Phil, and the Crazy Years of the Lakers Dynasty.

In 2022, Pearlman released The Last Folk Hero: The Life and Myth of Bo Jackson, a biography of Bo Jackson.

Career
Pearlman was born and raised in Mahopac, New York. He got his start in journalism in 1989, when he interned at a weekly newspaper in Cross River, titled The Patent Trader. After graduating from the University of Delaware, he was hired as a food and fashion writer by The Tennessean in Nashville. In 1996, Pearlman was hired by Sports Illustrated, where he spent nearly seven years as a baseball writer.

In 2002, Pearlman left Sports Illustrated and spent the next two years at Newsday, but left to focus on writing books. He also keeps a personal online blog, where he posts a weekly Q&A series, The Quaz, with athletes, politicians, actors, singers and many random people. He has also used the site to write about such intimate issues as seeing a rival book get publicity in Sports Illustrated, where he worked, or finding blood in his feces after using the toilet.

He was a frequent contributor to ESPN.com's Page 2, then as a columnist for SI.com. No stranger to controversy, Pearlman used his own website as a forum to call out the overzealous missionary goals of Tim Tebow's father as "pretty evil." In the fall of 2007, Pearlman wrote several controversial articles on Page 2 regarding the lack of a rivalry between the University of Delaware's and Delaware State University's football teams. UD and DSU finally played a football game on November 23, 2007 at part of the NCAA Division I FCS playoffs.  Delaware won the game with a score of 44–7.

References

External links
 
 Jeff Pearlman on ESPN.com

Place of birth missing (living people)
1972 births
Living people
University of Delaware alumni
People from Mahopac, New York
Writers from New Rochelle, New York
Journalists from New York (state)
Sportswriters from New York (state)